KSUI (91.7 FM) is a radio station broadcasting a Classical music format. Located near Iowa City, Iowa, United States, the station serves the Cedar Rapids and Iowa City areas.  The station is currently owned by the University of Iowa.  It is the flagship station of Iowa Public Radio's classical music network.

KSUI broadcasts in HD.

References

External links
 
 
 
 

SUI
NPR member stations
Classical music radio stations in the United States
1947 establishments in Iowa
Radio stations established in 1947